Jason R. Smith (born January 11, 1982 in Aspen, Colorado) a student of Fort Lewis College, is an American snowboarder, primarily successful in the event Snowboard Cross, finishing Sixth place in the 2006 Torino Winter Games.

He was the roommate of Seth Wescott, eventual Gold Medalist in Snowboard X (SBX or Snowboard Cross).

He is the younger brother of Christy Smith, the first Deaf contestant on Survivor: The Amazon.

External links
 Jason Smith on USSnowboarding.com
 sports-reference

1982 births
Living people
American male snowboarders
Snowboarders at the 2006 Winter Olympics